Mispila is a genus of longhorn beetles of the subfamily Lamiinae, with three subgenera - Dryusa, Mispila, and Trichomispila. It contains the following species:

subgenus Dryusa
 Mispila (Dryusa) coomani Breuning, 1968
 Mispila diluta Pascoe, 1864
 Mispila dotata Pascoe, 1864
 Mispila flavopunctata Breuning, 1950
 Mispila flexuosa Pascoe, 1864
 Mispila rufula Pascoe, 1864
 Mispila sonthianae Breuning, 1963

subgenus Mispila
 Mispila albopunctulata Heller, 1923
 Mispila albosignata Breuning, 1940
 Mispila annulicornis Pic, 1944
 Mispila apicalis Heller, 1923
 Mispila assamensis Breuning, 1938
 Mispila biarcuata Breuning, 1939
 Mispila celebensis Breuning, 1950
 Mispila (Mispila) coomani Pic, 1934
 Mispila curvifascia Breuning, 1938
 Mispila curvilinea Pascoe, 1869
 Mispila elongata Breuning, 1938
 Mispila impuncticollis Breuning, 1966
 Mispila javanica Breuning, 1938
 Mispila khamvengae Breuning, 1963
 Mispila mindanaonis Breuning, 1980
 Mispila minor Pic, 1926
 Mispila nicobarica Breuning, 1960
 Mispila nigrovittata Breuning, 1963
 Mispila notaticeps Pic, 1925
 Mispila obliquevittata Breuning, 1940
 Mispila obscura Gahan, 1890
 Mispila papuana Breuning, 1940
 Mispila papuensis Breuning, 1963
 Mispila parallela Breuning, 1937
 Mispila philippinica Heller, 1924
 Mispila plagiata Pic, 1934
 Mispila punctifrons Breuning, 1938
 Mispila samarensis Breuning, 1939
 Mispila sibuyana Breuning, 1939
 Mispila signata Pic, 1926
 Mispila siporensis Breuning, 1939
 Mispila subtonkinea Breuning, 1968
 Mispila taoi Breuning, 1963
 Mispila tholana Gressit, 1940
 Mispila tonkinea Pic, 1925
 Mispila tonkinensis Breuning, 1964
 Mispila venosa Pascoe, 1864
 Mispila zonaria Lacordaire, 1872

subgenus Trichomispila
 Mispila pedongensis Breuning, 1969
 Mispila picta Breuning, 1939

References

Pteropliini